Huron Charter Township is a charter township of Wayne County in the U.S. state of Michigan.  The population was 15,879 at the 2010 census.  Huron Charter Township is named after the Huron River, which flows southeast through the township.  The township is home to three divisions of the Huron–Clinton Metroparks system: Lower Huron, Oakwoods, and Willow.

Communities
New Boston contains its own post office that uses the 48164 ZIP Code, which serves most of the township and a small portion of Sumpter Township to the west and Brownstown Charter Township to the east.    

History
Huron Township was organized in 1827 and originally included the land that now contains the cities of Romulus and Belleville as well as the townships of Van Buren and Sumpter.  In the 1830s, a settlement was platted on the banks of the Huron River.  The first post office opened with the name Huron, but soon closed.  In 1860 a new post office was opened with the name Catville but changed its name to New Boston by 1868.  Other early settlements included Belden, platted in 1857 by Frances J. Belden and now known as Willow, and Waltz, platted in 1872 by Joseph Waltz.

On March 17, 1835 the northeastern portion of Huron Township was set off and organized as Romulus Township.  Within a few weeks, on April 6, 1835, the northwestern portion of the township became Van Buren Township.  On April 6, 1840 the western half of the remaining portion of Huron Township organized as the township of Sumpter, creating the current boundaries of township.

The Waltz Road–Huron River Bridge, first constructed in 1924 and later replaced in 2017, is listed on the National Register of Historic Places.

Geography

Major highways
 runs south–north through the center of the township.  The highway has three access points within the township: exit 8 (Will Carleton Road) at the county line with Monroe County, exit 11 (South Huron Road), and exit 13 (Sibley Road).

Demographics
As of the census of 2000, there were 13,737 people, 4,745 households, and 3,796 families residing in the township. The racial makeup of the township was 95.96% White, 1.08% African American, 0.64% Native American, 0.36% Asian, 0.01% Pacific Islander, 0.52% from other races, and 1.43% from two or more races. Hispanic or Latino residents of any race were 2.50% of the population.

There were 4,745 households, out of which 39.9% had children under the age of 18 living with them, 65.3% were married couples living together, 10.1% had a female householder with no husband present, and 20.0% were non-families. 15.8% of all households were made up of individuals, and 5.0% had someone living alone who was 65 years of age or older.  The average household size was 2.88 and the average family size was 3.19.

In the township 28.4% of the population was under the age of 18, 7.7% was from 18 to 24, 31.7% from 25 to 44, 24.4% from 45 to 64, and 7.7% was 65 years of age or older.  The median age was 35 years. For every 100 females, there were 100.9 males.  For every 100 females age 18 and over, there were 98.8 males.

The median income for a household in the township was $59,890, and the median income for a family was $63,003. Males had a median income of $49,356 versus $31,140 for females. The per capita income for the township was $23,497.  About 3.4% of families and 5.7% of the population were below the poverty line, including 5.9% of those under age 18 and 4.9% of those age 65 or over.

Education
Huron Township contains its own school district, Huron School District, which serves most of the township and very small portions of Ash Township to the south in Monroe County.  The southeastern corner of the township is served by Flat Rock Community Schools, and the northeastern portion of the township is served by Woodhaven-Brownstown School District.

References

External links

Huron Township official website
Huron School District

Townships in Wayne County, Michigan
Charter townships in Michigan
Metro Detroit
Populated places established in 1827
1827 establishments in Michigan Territory